Alpine station is an Amtrak station in Alpine, Texas, served by the Sunset Limited and Texas Eagle routes. It is not staffed and has partial wheelchair accessibility, an enclosed waiting area, public payphones, and parking.

History
The depot, commissioned in 1946 by the Texas and New Orleans Railroad, was built in the Spanish Mission Revival style with light Art Deco detailing. The façade facing the tracks has a projecting center bay with a large window framed by geometric rope detailing. An octagonal cupola with a finial tops the building.

Notable places nearby
Big Bend National Park
McDonald Observatory
Sul Ross State University

References

External links

Alpine Amtrak station information

Amtrak Stations Database

Alpine
Former Southern Pacific Railroad stations
Transportation in Brewster County, Texas
Buildings and structures in Brewster County, Texas
Railway stations in the United States opened in 1946